Goedehoop  (Afrikaans for good hope) is a settlement in Bojanala District Municipality in the North West province of South Africa.

References

Populated places in the Moses Kotane Local Municipality